Katie Neil (born in 1989) is an American pop rock singer-songwriter and former actress.

Biography

Early career
At the age of 8, Neil began working in Broadway and singing and acting in many shows. She worked with Community theatre and with the Kennedy Center for a while. At the age of 10, she moved to Manhattan. After a year on Broadway and with all of the performances she did, Neil began to get more into singing and pop music. This is when she released her debut album, How I Feel with Cliff Downs. Later, she released  Second Story with Chris Griffin, then In Transit.

Roles on Broadway
 Appearance with the Royal Shakespeare Company at the Kennedy Center (age 8)
 Washington Opera's Boris Godunov (Plácido Domingo, artistic director)
 The Nutcracker, with the Stanislavski Ballet, at the Kennedy Center
 Annie Get Your Gun, playing "Jessie Oakley" opposite Bernadette Peters (age 10)
 Fiddler on the Roof in Ocean City, New Jersey (ensemble role)
 Winnow Winds in Martinsburg, West Virginia (lead role)
 The Secret Garden, Philadelphia (playing the lead role, Mary Lennox)
 Broadway Kids recording of "America Sings"

Discography

How I Feel
When Neil was just 13, in 2003, she released her first album, How I Feel, produced by Cliff Downs.

Track listing:
 "It's Alright to Breakdown Sometimes"
 "How I Feel"
 "My Friend Nikki"
 "Till You Need Me"
 "Where the Sadness Dies"
 "Do Without You"
 "Everywhere You Go"
 "Guess I Never Loved You"
 " Can We Go the Distance"
 "Buses and Trains"
 "Far Away From Here"

Second Story
At age 15, in 2005, Neil came out with her first EP, entitled Second Story, produced and mixed by Chris Griffin.

Track listing:
 "Stripped Down"
 "Go Away"
 "It's Not the Same"
 "The Real Me"
 "School Daze"

In Transit
Neil released her second EP in June 2006, entitled In Transit.

Track listing:
 "Stupid Ex Boyfriend"
 "Bad For You"
 "Good Day Down"
 "Unspoken"
 "You're Not the Only One".

The song "Stupid Ex Boyfriend" was a featured "Hip Clipz" tune on the website of Curly Grrlz Skateboards.

Personal life
Neil currently resides in an apartment building with her parents in New York City, where she is attending high school.

References

 Review of Second Story – includes references to other press
 Press release, November 20, 2003

External links
 Neil's official site
 Neil's MySpace page
 Neil's official fansite

1989 births
Living people
American stage actresses
Actresses from New York City
21st-century American singers
21st-century American women singers